Mont-de-l'Enclus is a municipality of Wallonia located in the province of Hainaut, Belgium. 

It consists of the districts of Amougies, Anserœul, Orroir and Russegnies.

The municipality is located in Picardy Wallonia.

References

External links
 

Municipalities of Hainaut (province)